Sarab-e Abd ol Ali (also Romanized as Sarāb-e ‘Abd ol ‘Alī; also known as Sarāb-e Abdālī and Āb Sard-e Sarāb) is a village in Miyankuh-e Sharqi Rural District, Mamulan District, Pol-e Dokhtar County, Lorestan Province, Iran. At the 2006 census, its population was 317, in 70 families.

References 

Towns and villages in Pol-e Dokhtar County